Red espresso (stylised as red espresso) is the brand name of The Red Espresso Company Pty Ltd, a South African manufacturer of Rooibos tea products. The company was founded by Pete and Monique Ethelston and Carl Pretorius in 2005 when Carl invented a way to express a shot of Rooibos tea on an espresso machine as a caffeine-free alternative to coffee.

Product 
red espresso is packaged as pre-ground Rooibos tea, pods and capsules, and can be made on all coffee appliances, such as espresso machines, stovetop espresso makers, drip filter machines, Nespresso machines and French press.

Promoted as "An Espresso Made from Tea", red espresso is made from naturally caffeine-free Rooibos tea leaves that have been ground finer to work on a coffee appliance. When expressed, it has a strong colour and flavour, coated with a crema, just like coffee. It is used to make cappuccinos, lattes and iced teas.

Awards 
So far, red espresso has won five awards, including:
World Tea Expo Top 10 New Products
Food Review/Symrise New Product of the Year 2006 
IUFOST Global Food Award for Product Innovation 2008
Marketing Excellence Award
Best New Product – Specialty Beverage Award 2008/9" from The Specialty Coffee Association of America (SCAA)
It made history as the first tea ever to win in the Specialty Beverage Category and also the first South African Company to win at SCAA

Drinks 
 Red cappuccino 
 Red latte
 Fresh red iced tea

See also
Rooibos

References

External links 
 red espresso | caffeine-free Rooibos tea espresso (Official website)

2005 establishments in South Africa
Drink companies of South Africa
Economy of the Western Cape
Paarl
Non-alcoholic drinks
South African drinks
Herbal tea
Food and drink introduced in 2005